is a town located in Yamagata Prefecture, Japan. , the town had an estimated population of 5,225 in 1851 households, and a population density of 145.1 persons per km².

Geography
Nishikawa is located in mountainous central Yamagata and includes Mount Gassan and Mount Asahi within its borders. The Sagae River passes through the town. Part of the town is within the borders of the Bandai-Asahi National Park.

Neighboring municipalities
Yamagata Prefecture
Sagae
Tsuruoka
Ōe
Asahi
Oguni
Shōnai
Ōkura
Niigata Prefecture
Murakami

Climate
Nishikawa has a Humid continental climate (Köppen climate classification Dfb) with large seasonal temperature differences, with warm to hot (and often humid) summers and cold (sometimes severely cold) winters. Precipitation is significant throughout the year, but is heaviest from August to October.

Demographics
Per Japanese census data, the population of Nishikawa peaked around 1950 and has declined considerably since then. It is now less than half what it was a century ago.

History
The area of present-day Nishikawa was part of ancient Dewa Province. After the start of the Meiji period, the area became part of Nishimurayama District, Yamagata Prefecture. The town of Nishikawa was established on October 1, 1954 by the merger of the villages of Kawadoi, Nishiyama, Hondōji and Ōisawa.

Economy
The economy of Nishikawa is based on seasonal tourism and forestry.

Education
Nishikawa has one public elementary schools and one public middle school operated by the town government. The town does not have a high school.

Transportation

Railway
Nishikawa is not served by any passenger rail service. The nearest station is Uzen-Takamatsu Station in the neighboring city of Sagae.

Highway
   Yamagata Expressway : Nishikawa IC, Gassan IC

Local attractions
Mount Gassan
Mount Asahi
Mizugatoro Dam
Sagae Dam
Iwanesawa Sanzan Shrine

Sister city relations
 Frisco, Colorado, USA – since August 29, 1990

References

External links
 
Official Website 

 
Towns in Yamagata Prefecture